Saints Theodores Greek Orthodox Church is a heritage-listed church at 799 Flinders Street, Townsville CBD, City of Townsville, Queensland, Australia. It was designed by M. Vogiatzoglou and Joseph Gabriel Rooney, and built from 1947 to 1950 by Vause and Hayne. It was added to the Queensland Heritage Register on 25 August 2000.

History 
The foundation stone of Townsville's Saints Theodores Greek Orthodox Church was laid on 16 March 1947. In June 1950 this Church was officially opened and dedicated, though religious practice had commenced from 1948 while the building was still being completed. It is named after three saints called Theodore.

Some of the earliest Greek migrants to Australia arrived in the 1850s. Many of these were sailors or deckhands who jumped ship after arriving aboard sailing vessels at the various Australian port cities. In the Australian Colonies these early Greeks found employment generally in mining, seamen aboard coastal shipping, or as wharf labourers.

In Queensland little evidence exists to a Greek presence during the greater part of the 19th century, but the first Greek to this Colony to be naturalised was Christopher Arsenios in 1868. Arsenios was a Greek Orthodox Priest who heralded from Corfu, who settled in Clermont.

The first real wave of Greek migration to Australia did not take place until the early part of the 20th century, in the years leading up to the commencement of World War I. By the turn of the 20th century the numbers of Greeks in Australia was insignificant. Even in the major cities such as Sydney and Melbourne, Greeks only composed a very small group. By 1915 though, some 1000 Greeks were estimated as residing in Sydney alone, and in Queensland 400, with fifty in Brisbane. In Queensland evidence suggests that the major place of origin of these Greek migrants by 1915 was from Kythira.

One of the main reasons for these Greek arrivals in Australia was the political unrest at home in the period prior to World War I, as it was to occur again in the 1920s. The Balkan Wars took place during 1912 and 1913, involving Greece, Serbia, Bulgaria, Montenegro and Turkey. In order to escape the effects of this conflict many Greeks left Macedonia and other northern regions and came to places such as Australia.

The first decade of the 20th century was a turbulent period in Greek politics, Greece being constantly in conflict with Bulgaria and Turkey over Macedonia and Crete. This factor gave a spur to Greek migration overseas. Most of the migrants went to North America but some came to Australia. The small number who had come to these shores in the nineteenth century had no doubt sent word back of possibilities in this country and their compatriots were now following them.

After the end of World War I, another spur to Greek migration was a subsequent war between Greece and Turkey over Smyrna that broke out during 1921–1922. As a destination for Greek migrants, Australia was to become an even more obvious choice from 1924, due to the United States of America instituted a severe quota limit on migration into that country. The subsequent Greek arrivals in places such as Queensland accelerated the proliferation of Greek cafes and other eating places in Brisbane and the country. The new arrivals found that the path to success had already been carved out by the pioneers of the first two decades. One history of Greek migration to Queensland surmised:"The period from 1915 to the Second World War marks the expansion of the Greek Community throughout [Queensland] ... and its growing organisation. Not only does the Greek population in Brisbane undergo a sharp increase but there is a building up of significant Greek settlements in all the provincial cities and the appearance of al least one Greek family in almost every small town in the State. This is the period when the Greek cafe, with its aproned proprietor and culinary aromas, became one of the focal points of town life. If the town could not support a Greek cafe, it was still in its infancy! Everywhere, there sprang up Busy Bee Cafes, and Blue Bird Cafes, and Paragon Cafes, and Majestic Cafes and Bellevue Cafes!"In Queensland prior to World War I, one of the few significant regional Greek communities that came into existence was at Innisfail. This community commenced in about 1910, with its Greek residents becoming either shopkeepers or labourers. Other canefield communities with a Greek presence at this time were also Gordonvale and Ingham.

In Townsville, Greeks began to arrive and settle in this locale in approximately 1916. Amongst the first arrivals recorded were Spyros and Vasilios Makris, Raftopoulos, Maltepes, John and Dimitrios Hondros and Nicholas and George Voyatzis. Though these early Townsville Greeks did not establish a formal Greek Community until the 1940s, they nonetheless periodically organised social, cultural and religious activities in celebration of their Greek origins. To meet the interim religious needs of this developing Townsville Greek community, a visiting priest from Innisfail conducted services in St James' Cathedral, as did Metropolitan of Australia Timotheos Evangelinidis when visiting this community. Metropolitan Timotheos was also to be instrumental in establishing the Greek Community in Townsville.

In Brisbane the growing Greek community in the years prior to World War I made the first attempt to organise a community organisation with the formation of the Greek Association of Queensland in 1913. This Association had its headquarters in Adelaide Street, Brisbane, where members ran a coffee shop and discussion group, though little other information is known about it. As the Greek population grew further, so did the need for a Greek community centre to be instituted to cater for the community's social, religious and cultural needs. At a general meeting of the Association of Greeks in Queensland in 1921, the creation of a community centre was realised and the Greek Community of Queensland was formed. This meeting resolved that a proprietary company be established so that the purchase and management of a suitable property could be undertaken. Shortly after this company was able to purchase a building in Charlotte Street, Brisbane, which served as the Greek Community Centre until the 1970s. Before long, Hellenic House, as the building was named, became a household word throughout the Greek Community of Queensland, a Greek oasis, a place where a Greek could freely speak his language and not offend anyone.

The newly established Greek Community of Queensland in 1922 soon had their own permanent priest, Father Maravelis, and a Greek School was also instituted. Regular Greek Orthodox services were held in the Church of England Churches of St Thomas' in South Brisbane, and St Luke's in Charlotte Street, Brisbane. The first Greek priest ordained in Brisbane was Elias Kotiathis in 1927, who succeeded Father Maravelis. The Brisbane Greek community was to truly come of age in 1929 with the opening of the first Greek Orthodox Church in Queensland, St Georges in Charlotte Street. The building set the seal on the work of the early pioneers and for a generation remained a centre of religious life for Queensland's Greeks.

By the 1930s the Greek community in Brisbane developed further with the formation of the Kytherian Association in 1935, and a Greek newspaper, The Queensland Messenger, albeit short-lived, was launched in 1931. Outside of Brisbane in Biloela, where a large settlement of Rhodian cotton workers had established themselves, a Rhodian Fellowship was set up in 1931. While the second Greek Orthodox Church in Queensland was erected in Innisfail in 1935. This Church came as a result of the efforts of the local community who had already formed a Greek Brotherhood, which was renamed The Greek Orthodox Community of Innisfail and North Queensland in 1934. The Greek community of Queensland also had an honorary consul residing in Brisbane, Christy Freeleagus, appointed in 1919 and active until his death in 1957.

During one of the visits of Archbishop Timothios to Townsville in April 1944, one Greek resident, Thedoros Calagatis, offered the archbishop £1000 for the purpose of building a Greek Church in Townsville. As a result, Archbishop Timothios called a general meeting of all Townsville Greeks on Sunday 4 May 1944. Approximately 65 people attended this meeting in which Archbishop Timothios was president, the chairman was Mr S. Nennas, and Mr George Keyatta, M.L.A., also presided:The meeting ended at 1.30 a.m. and nearly £3,000 was collected. The object of the collection was to establish and maintain faithfully and irrevocably the Dogma, the Holy Canons and conform to the immemorial usage of the Greek Orthodox church; to build and maintain a sacred church for public worship in the name of Saint Theodores; to establish a Greek school for the teaching of the Greek language and promote religious and moral education; to promote good-will and co-operation between members of the community and to ensure loyalty to the laws of this country and to promote good fellowship between our Australian citizens. The trustees of this fund being His Grace Archbishop Timothios of Australia and New Zealand, The Consul General for Greece, Mr. Freeleagus, and George Keyatta, M.L.A. The money collected was deposited in the Bank of Australasia on account of the Greek Orthodox Church and School Building Fund.

In approximately March 1945, a committee was elected at a general meeting with the power to acquire property and maintain the objects of the Greek Community of Townsville. This also included the commitment to build a church, priest's residence, and a community hall. Shortly afterwards a start was made to build a Greek Orthodox Church in Townsville when the granite foundation stone was laid in a ceremony performed by Archbishop Timothios, and attended by the Honorary Greek Consul Mr C. Freeleagus, on 16 March 1947.

Also present was Mr A Stratigos, special envoy from Greece and Vice-President for the Greek-Australian Soldiers' League who six months earlier brought to Australia an urn containing earth from Australian soldiers' graves in Greece. By doing this, a 2600-year tradition was broken by which it was forbidden to send Greek soil to another country. This tradition was broken as a mark of admiration and esteem which the Greek Government holds towards Australia in sending men to help in the defence of Greek territory. The soil was presented to the Prime Minister of Australia, Ben Chifley.

The foundation Committee members responsible for the commencement of this church and the laying of the foundation stone were:"Mr Theodoros Kalafatis, Great Benefactor and Honorary Chairman; Mr Michael Leondarakis, President; Mr Emmanuel Atherinos, Vice President; Mr John Manikaros, Secretary; Mr Spyridon Theo Nennas, Treasurer; Mr Charlie Marendy; Mr George Kyriakakis; Mr Emmanuel Barboutis; Mr Michael N. Bogiatzis, Members."Townsville's Saints Theodores Church, the third Greek Orthodox Church built in Queensland, was designed by M. Vogiatzoglou. The architect for the project was J.G. Rooney, and the builders were Vause and Hayne. The local Townsville firm of Gelling & Haig, a business which operated in Flinders Street (1931–1974), made the steelwork used in the construction of this Church.

One history of Townsville produced several years after the official opening and dedication of Saints Theodores, describes the internal religious decoration and splendour that is visible within this Church:"The interior of the church follows the Byzantine style of architecture; in the congregation's section, graceful rounded columns merge into picturesque arches to support a choir gallery; from this again rise columns and arches which combine to produce a quintessence of reverend and artistic atmosphere. The portion of the church allotted to the altar rises straight to the domed roof in most effective fashion. The stranger, walking towards the altar, automatically sweeps the eyes upwards to the dome, and the effect there is startling and a trifle awe-inspiring-on the ceiling looms a painting of the Christ, hands raised in benediction and gazing straight downwards."The religious icons painted on the plaster of the dome were undertaken by artist Angelo Manolios, who was brought from Greece (from the Island of Lesvos) for the purpose. Manolios carried out this task over twelve months, lying on his back on scaffolding specially raised for the purpose. His work across and around the altar depicts the teachings of the Orthodox Church.

The first services held in Saints Theodores Church took place eleven months after the foundation stone ceremony (February 1948) while the Church was still under construction. The first parish priest was Father George Kateris who served Townsville's Greek community during 1946 to 1953. The first wedding to take place in this Church occurred on 19 September 1948 between Luke and Despo Lucas.

Saints Theodores Church was officially opened and dedicated by Metropolitan Theophylactos Papathanasopoulos in June 1950. Four decades later, on Sunday 17 June 1990, Townsville's Greek Community celebrated the 40th anniversary of the official opening and dedication of their Church.

On Sunday 30 March 1997, parishioners and guests of the Greek Orthodox Parish and Community of Saints Theodores Townsville celebrated the 50th anniversary of the Laying of the Foundation Stone of the Church. A service, followed by an Anniversary Dinner Dance was celebrated by parishioners in the presence of His Eminence Stylianos Harkianakis, Primate of the Greek Orthodox Church in Australia, the Consul General of Greece, the Consul General of Cyprus, as well as local, state and federal government representatives. One of the numerous congratulatory messages received at this time was from Mary Kalantzis, Professor of Education at the James Cook University, who summed up the importance of this Church to the local Greek Community:The Church is a testimony to the important role the Greek Community has played in this region. It has now stood for half a century, an impressive reminder to all that the Greek Community is a part of the history of economic and social development in Northern Australia. It is also living evidence that loyal, contributing Australians can express faith in many different ways and can hold dear different cultural traditions.Throughout its existence, Townsville's Saints Theodores Church has also been (and still continues to be) the central focus of activities contributing to the social and cultural aspects and well-being of Townsville's Greek Community. This includes the provision and fostering of an Ethnic Greek School, Greek Dancing School, Hellenic Youth Association, Greek Ladies' Auxiliary, Hellenic Senior Citizens, a Greek Orthodox Church Playgroup, and Debutante Balls through the Saints Theodores Parish of Townsville.

The local Greek Community, as do many visitors, maintain that Townsville's Saints Theodores Church is the most beautiful Greek Orthodox Church in Australia.

Description 
Saints Theodores Greek Orthodox Church fronts onto 654 Sturt Street, Townsville.

This Church is a red brick building with a centrally located tower above the main entrance to Sturt Street.

The roof of the tower and the dome above the altar are painted white, as are the window frames on the upper section of the tower.

The Church's interior comprises the congregation's section, with a choir gallery above.

The altar and side walls comprise a series of Greek Orthodox religious paintings and icons. Above the altar is a dome which depicts Christ with outstretched hands, as well as containing representations of the Apostles.

Heritage listing 
Saints Theodores Greek Orthodox Church was listed on the Queensland Heritage Register on 25 August 2000 having satisfied the following criteria.

The place is important in demonstrating the evolution or pattern of Queensland's history.

Saints Theodores Greek Orthodox Church is important in demonstrating the pattern of Greek migration and settlement in Queensland, and the role of the Townsville Greek Community in meeting the needs of their Orthodox parishioners.

The place demonstrates rare, uncommon or endangered aspects of Queensland's cultural heritage.

Saints Theodores Church demonstrates rare external and internal architecture and decoration associated with Greek Orthodox religious practice and traditions in a Queensland (or Australian) context.

The place is important because of its aesthetic significance.

This Church also exhibits particular aesthetic characteristics contributing to the streetscape of Sturt Street, Townsville, valued not only by the local Greek Orthodox parishioners, but also the Townsville and broader Queensland community.

The place has a strong or special association with a particular community or cultural group for social, cultural or spiritual reasons.

This place has a special association with the important Greek migrant community to Queensland that developed during the 19th and 20th centuries, and now continues into the present 21st century.

The place has a special association with the life or work of a particular person, group or organisation of importance in Queensland's history.

In particular this Church stands testament to the strong sense of identity and cooperation exhibited by the Greek Community of Townsville from its formation in the 1940s to the present.

References

Attribution

External links

  — description of the consecration of the church

Queensland Heritage Register
Townsville CBD
Churches in Queensland
Articles incorporating text from the Queensland Heritage Register